Tomášovce may refer to:

Tomášovce, Lučenec District, Slovakia
Tomášovce, Rimavská Sobota District, Rimavská Sobota District, Slovakia
Spišské Tomášovce, a village and municipality in the Spišská Nová Ves District, Košice Region, Slovakia